Playboy One was a free-to-air satellite television channel in the United Kingdom, and was the only permanently free-to-air television station operated by Playboy Enterprises.

History
The service launched on 14 November 2005, and was described as a general male entertainment channel with a lower LCN, placing it in the "Entertainment" section of the Sky EPG, as opposed to specialist where its sister channel lies. However, after the 9.00pm watershed as the channel would show some erotic programming, including Playboy's Babes, Sexcetera and Red Shoe Diaries. By 2006, a newly-added "Adult" category was added to the EPG, and so the channel moved there.

The channel aimed to attract men to the pay-per-view Playboy TV, operating on the same satellite service. Despite a low profile, it steadily increased its ratings. As of the week ending 7 January 2007, BARB were quoting a weekly reach of 1,122,000 (2.5%)

On 1 October 2008, the channel was replaced with a Paul Raymond-focused channel named Paul Raymond TV, and became encrypted.

See also
 List of adult television channels

British pornographic television channels
Defunct television channels in the United Kingdom
Television channels and stations established in 2005
Television channels and stations disestablished in 2008
Television pornography